Ayman Hakeem (born 24 December 1959) is a Syrian football coach.

Coaching career
Hakeem started his coaching career with Al-Wahda winning the Syrian Cup in 1993. During the 1990s, he took over youth teams, Syria U20 and Syria U23. Later on, he managed Al-Wahda for several separate occasions, and served as an assistant of Valeriu Tiţa during the 2011 AFC Asian Cup. He spent some time in Iraq with Duhok, and in Jordan with Al-Faisaly, Ittihad Al-Ramtha and Al-Ramtha.

On May 9, 2016, Hakeem was appointed as the head coach of the Syria national football team. He led the team to their best performance in which they played the 2018 FIFA World Cup qualification – AFC Fourth Round against Australia, only losing in extra time.

On November 20, 2017, Hakeem resigned from coaching Syria.

On the first of March 2019, he was appointed as the head coach of Syria national under-23 instead of Hussein Affash.

In February 2021, he became the head coach of Al-Wahda for another tenure during the AFC Cup.

References

External links 
 

1959 births
Living people
Syrian football managers
Syrian expatriate football managers
Syria national football team managers
Sportspeople from Damascus
Al-Wahda SC (Syria) managers
Al-Jaish Damascus managers
Expatriate football managers in Iraq
Expatriate football managers in Jordan
Al-Faisaly SC managers
Al-Ramtha SC managers